Loxodida is an order of karyorelict ciliates.

The term Loxodida derives from the ancient greek , meaning "oblique, tilted".

References

External links 
 

Karyorelictea
Ciliate orders